Ennio Maffiolini (1902 - date of death unknown) was an Italian sprinter (400 m).

Biography
Ennio Maffiolini participated at one edition of the Summer Olympics (1924).

Olympic results

National championships
Ennio Maffiolini has won 2 times the national championship.
2 wins on 4x400 metres relay (1921, 1924)

See also
 Italy national relay team

References

External links
 
 

1902 births
Year of death missing
Italian male sprinters
Athletes (track and field) at the 1924 Summer Olympics
Olympic athletes of Italy